The Burnham Athenaeum, also known as the Champaign Public Library, is a historic library building located at 306 W. Church St. in Champaign, Illinois. Built in 1896 through a donation from Albert C. Burnham, the building was Champaign's first permanent library. Architect Julius A. Schweinfurth designed the Classical Revival building. The two-story building is built from cream-colored brick with terra cotta ornamentation. The front entrance features four two-story Ionic columns supporting a pediment and an inscribed frieze. A terra cotta band encircles the building below the second-story window sill line. The Champaign Public Library occupied the building until 1978, when it moved to a larger facility.

The building was added to the National Register of Historic Places on June 7, 1978.

References

Buildings and structures in Champaign, Illinois
Libraries on the National Register of Historic Places in Illinois
Library buildings completed in 1896
National Register of Historic Places in Champaign County, Illinois
Neoclassical architecture in Illinois